Emily Hester Brodrick (née Melvill;  15 April 1846 – 1906) was an English writer. She published novels as Mrs Alan Brodrick.

Life
Brodrick was born at Fort William, Calcutta on 15 April 1846, or 25 April, the eldest daughter of Philip Melvill (1817–1854), eldest son of Sir James Cosmo Melvill, and his wife Emily Jane Hogg, daughter of Charles Hogg. The Melvill family was highly influential in the East India Company. to Hon. Alan Brodrick, younger son of the 7th Viscount Midleton, She was baptised on 8 June that year.

After her marriage, she was a vicar's wife in Godalming from 1875, and Alverstoke from 1885 to 1901. In Alverstoke she was involved in setting up allotments on the glebe land. Alan became Master of the Hospital of St Cross, in Winchester, where they moved in 1901.

Death and legacy

Emily Brodrick died in 1906. In 1907 her husband dedicated Brodrick Memorial Hall in Gosport, which he and the parish built, to her memory, and also the restored South Chapel of the Hospital of St Cross.

Works
Brodrick wrote in The Monthly Packet edited by Charlotte Mary Yonge, in 1888. She wrote novels. Her writing involved social themes treated from an Anglican point of view. Her works were:

The Creed of Philip Glyn (1896). Reviewed dismissively by H. G. Wells. The setting on the Gosport peninsula included landmarks such as Gilkicker Tower and Haslar Creek.
Ananias (1898)
Joscelyn's Pictures, 2nd edition in 1901 reviewed in The Spectator.

Family
Emily married the Rev. Hon. Alan Brodrick, son of William Brodrick, 7th Viscount Midleton, on 18 June 1867. They had five children:

Alan Melvill Brodrick (1868–1933), married in 1898 Beatrice, daughter of the barrister Henry Ernst Hall (1845–1918). The marriage was dissolved in 1901. He then married Diana Peacey.
Mabel Emily (1869–1956) married in 1892 William Lowther Grant.
William John Henry Brodrick (1874–1964), a barrister.
George Trevor Brodrick (1877–1902).
Dorothea Mary (1889–1953), married Hugh Gildart Worsley.

Notes

1846 births
1906 deaths
19th-century English novelists
20th-century English novelists
19th-century English women writers
19th-century English writers
20th-century English women writers
People from Godalming
People from Gosport
Writers from Hampshire
Victorian women writers
Writers from Kolkata
Melvill family